Marcelo Silva Ramos  (born June 25, 1973) is a Brazilian former footballer who played as a  striker.

Career
Born in Bahia state, Marcelo Ramos was a prolific goal-scorer throughout his career. He played club football in Brazil, Netherlands, Japan and Colombia.
He scored 12 goals for Atlético Paranaense as the club finished runner's-up in the 2008 Campeonato Paranaense.

Club statistics

Honours

Club
Bahia
 Campeonato Baiano: 1991, 1993, 1994

Cruzeiro
 Copa de Oro: 1995
 Copa Master de Supercopa: 1995
 Copa do Brasil: 1996, 2003
 Campeonato Mineiro: 1996, 1997, 1998, 2003
 Copa Libertadores: 1997
 Recopa Sudamericana: 1998
 Copa Centro Oeste: 1999
 Copa Sul-Minas: 2001, 2002

PSV
 Eredivisie: 1996-97
 Johan Cruyff Shield: 1996, 1997

Palmeiras
Torneio Rio-São Paulo: 2000
Copa dos Campeões: 2000

Vitória
Campeonato Baiano: 2005

Ipatinga
Campeonato Mineiro Módulo II: 2009

Paysandu
Campeonato Paraense: 2010

Madureira
Copa Rio: 2011

Araxá
Campeonato Mineiro Módulo II: 2011

Individual
Minas Gerais state league's top scorer: 1996
Brazilian Cup's top scorer: 1996

References

External links
 
  furacao
  wanadoo.nl

1973 births
Living people
Association football forwards
Brazilian footballers
Sportspeople from Salvador, Bahia
Brazilian expatriate footballers
Campeonato Brasileiro Série A players
Campeonato Brasileiro Série B players
Eredivisie players
J1 League players
J2 League players
Categoría Primera A players
Esporte Clube Bahia players
Cruzeiro Esporte Clube players
PSV Eindhoven players
São Paulo FC players
Nagoya Grampus players
Sanfrecce Hiroshima players
Sport Club Corinthians Paulista players
Esporte Clube Vitória players
Atlético Nacional footballers
Santa Cruz Futebol Clube players
Club Athletico Paranaense players
Madureira Esporte Clube players
Itumbiara Esporte Clube players
Paysandu Sport Club players
Copa Libertadores-winning players
Expatriate footballers in the Netherlands
Expatriate footballers in Japan
Expatriate footballers in Colombia